Jackie "Butch" Jenkins (August 29, 1937 – August 14, 2001) was an American child actor who had a brief but notable film career during the 1940s.

Career
Born Jack Dudley Jenkins in Los Angeles, the son of actress Doris Dudley, Jenkins made his film debut at the age of six in The Human Comedy (1943) as "Ulysses Macauley" after an MGM talent scout saw him playing on a Santa Monica beach and admired his high spirits. His performance as Mickey Rooney's younger brother (The Human Comedy) was well received and Jenkins was cast in a succession of films.

He was given star billing for the 1946 film Boys' Ranch.  Inspired by the real-life ranch in Texas, which provided a home and education to underprivileged boys,  MGM promoted the film as a successor to Boys Town (1938). It co-starred James Craig, who also appeared in Jenkins' other films The Human Comedy and Little Mr. Jim. Jenkins' other films include National Velvet (1944), Our Vines Have Tender Grapes (1945), My Brother Talks to Horses (1947), The Bride Goes Wild (1948) Summer Holiday (1948), and his final film Big City (1948).

Jenkins was one of several popular child actors at MGM during the early 1940s, and was educated at the studio's school along with other youngsters under contract to the studio such as Elizabeth Taylor, Margaret O'Brien, Claude Jarman Jr. and Darryl Hickman.

He was regarded as a "scene-stealer" and was notable among the studio's child stars for not being conventionally "cute".  He was described by film writers Sol Chaneles and Albert Wolsky as "an audience favourite as an all-American boy [with a] space between his teeth, freckles and a tousled mop of hair – a marked contrast to the pretty children who usually appeared on screen." Pauline Kael wrote approvingly of his effectiveness as a performer, saying that his appearance as a five-year-old who enjoys waving at trains in The Human Comedy helped elevate the film, while his performance in National Velvet made him "the little brother of everyone's dreams". In 1946, exhibitors (movie theater owners) voted him the second-most promising "star of tomorrow".

Later life and death
Jenkins retired from acting at the age of eleven, after he developed a stutter, and as an adult recalled his film career fondly and without regret. He did state, however, that he had not particularly enjoyed acting and had never expected to make a career of it. 

Later described as a "businessman-outdoorsman", Jenkins established a successful career away from Hollywood and lived for many years in Dallas, Texas, before moving to North Carolina in the late 1970s, where he built a home "on the side of a steep mountain", where he resided with his third wife, Gloria.

On August 14, 2001, he died at age 63 in Asheville, North Carolina. Upon his death, he was cremated and his ashes returned to his family.

Filmography

Notes

Bibliography 
 Holmstrom, John. The Moving Picture Boy: An International Encyclopaedia from 1895 to 1995, Norwich, Michael Russell, 1996, pp. 205–206.
 Best, Marc. Those Endearing Young Charms: Child Performers of the Screen, South Brunswick and New York: Barnes & Co., 1971, pp. 134–138.

External links

 
 

1937 births
2001 deaths
American male child actors
American male film actors
Metro-Goldwyn-Mayer contract players
20th-century American male actors
Greenhill School alumni